Bernard Fantus (September 1, 1874 – April 14, 1940) was a Hungarian Jewish-American physician. He established the first hospital blood bank in the United States in 1937 at Cook County Hospital, Chicago while he served there as director of the pharmacology and therapeutics department.

Biography
Bernard Fantus was born to David and Ida (Gentilli) Fantus in Budapest, Hungary. As a child, Fantus was educated at Real-Gymnasium in Vienna, Austria. From a young age, his parents supported his ambition to be a physician. In 1889, at the age of fifteen, he and his parents immigrated to the United States. In Detroit, Michigan, Fantus was an apprentice for Mr. Leushner at Paul Leuchner's Drug store, who began training him in pharmacy. By 1902 the family relocated to Chicago, Illinois.

Fantus received his Doctor of Medicine in 1899 from the College of Physicians and Surgeons (Chicago).He furthered his education by doing post-graduate work at the University of Strasbourg in 1906 and the University of Berlin in 1909. Fantus also received a Master of Science from the University of Michigan in 1917, where he had done research in Pharmacology with Professor Cushny during the summer of 1901.

Fantus married Emily Senn, a nurse who he met at Cook County Hospital, on September 1, 1907. He had a daughter named Ruth.
 Daughter Ruth Fantus aka Valeri Gendron (December 14, 1913 – March 21, 1989): Adopted

After suffering a heart attack the year prior, Fantus died on April 14, 1940 at the age of sixty-five. Fantus was buried at Forest Home Cemetery (Chicago).

Career

Source:

Palatable Medication 
From about 1910–1915, at the Pharmacological Laboratory of the University of Illinois, Fantus conducted research in order to formulate medications that were more enjoyable to children. Knowing that medication in the form of candy would be best for children, Fantus studied candy confection and worked with candy-makers in order to determine that "sweet tablets" would be the best way to administer medicine to kids in a candy form. Fantus' goal was to create medications that were not only palatable to children, but relatively easy and inexpensive to make, in order for them to be readily available and accessible to the public. Strong emphasis was put on the ability of the tablet to dissolve, to be an attractive color, and to have a palatable sweet flavor not reminiscent of typical medicine.

In order to make sweet tablets, one needs a tablet machine. Fantus recommends the No. 25 Machine from the Whitall Tatum Company, which, at the time, was effective and inexpensive at only ten dollars.

Fantus found that the most effect way to disguise the taste of medicine and still maintain an effective integrity that met his criteria was with sugar coating and the use of tolu. The idea was to cover the medicine with resin then sugar. To saturate the granules of medical powders, Fantus used a solution consisting of tolu, saccharin, and alcohol. Fantus suggests the addition of saccharin to lessen any aftertaste.

Candy Medication 
In 1915, Fantus published a book called Candy Medication. Through his book, Fantus sought to make sweet tablets common place by giving pharmacists and physicians a guide book of sorts.  

Sources:

Contents 
 Historical Introduction
 Tabellae Dulces
 The Uses of Sweet Tablets
 The Making of Sweet Tablets
 The Tablet Machine
 The Construction off Formulae for Sweet Tablets
 Choice of Flavor
 Subduing of Tastes
 Choice of Color
 Formulae for the Preparation of Sweet Tablets
 Formulae for Stock Preparations

In the book, Fantus includes sweet tablet formulas for the following:

 Acetophenetidin
 Acetaminosalol
 Cocaine
 Heroin
 Aspirin
 Aconitine
 Anaesthesin
 Antimony potassium tartrate
 Antipyrine
 Apomorphine
 Arsenic trioxide
 Atropine
 Bismuth subcarbonate
 Bismuth subnitrate
 Caffeine
 Charcoal
 Cerium oxalate
 Chalk
 Emetine
 Lactic acid fermentation
 Ferrous carbonate
 Arsenic
 Iron
 Quinine
 Strychnine
 Nitroglycerin (drug)
 Urotropin
 Mercury chloride
 Mercury(II) iodide
 Hyoscine

In 1918, three years after the publication of Candy Medication, Fantus published an article in the Journal of the American Pharmaceutical Association entitled "Tolu and sugar coating in the disguising of medicines," in which he amended some of his formulas from the book.

Source:

Therapeutics 
Therapeutics involves the comprehensive care of patients and is sometimes considered the science of healing. Preventative medicine and the proper use of drugs in treatments and administration fall under the purview of pharmacologic therapeutics.

Therapies worked on:
 Amebiasis
 Insomnia
 Tetanus
 Rheumatic Fever
 Dextrose Phleboclysis
 Conjunctivitis
 Fresh Accidental Wounds
 Ersipelas
 Furunculosis Fever Regimen 
 Barbiturate Poisoning 
 Mycoses
 Anthrax
 Carbuncles
 Eczema
 Burns
 Glaucoma
 Chanoroid
 Bubo
 Bedsores
 Pain
 Ulcer
 Uncinariasis
 Trichiniasias
 Varicose Veins
 Acne
 Acne Rosacaea
 Arterial Thrombosis of the Extremities
 Eclampsia

The Blood Bank 
Throughout his career, Fantus became acutely aware of the importance of having access to blood for transfusions and the lack of accessibility that existed at the time. Transfusions were typically only done directly from donor to patient and were typically not used for emergency traumas. Fantus was introduced to the idea of blood being stored as the Spanish Revolution was underway and he immediately realized the multitude of possibilities and the abundance of lives that could be saved, especially in times of war, that storing blood for transfusion presented. From information he obtained from Russian publications, Fantus learned that storing blood was a rather simple process and that establishing some sort of laboratory for it in the United States would not be very complicated. From that point on, Fantus made it his mission to establish a laboratory where blood could be stored. His daughter Ruth is credited with coming up with the term "blood bank," a phrase which Fantus readily accepted because everyone in society knows how a bank works, and the process of storing blood was essentially analogous. World War II spurred Fantus on as he wanted to use the blood from people state side to save the lives of U.S. soldiers overseas. He thus spent years in the laboratory perfecting methods of transfusion.

Fantus secured permission, spread the word of the establishment, obtained a suitable room at Cook County Hospital, and put Dr. Elizabeth Schermer in charge of the laboratory. The blood bank officially opened on March 15, 1937.

Memberships 
 American Medical Association
 American Pharmacists Association
 American Association for the Advancement of Science
 American College of Physicians
 Chicago Society of Internal Medicine
 National Formulary
 American Public Health Association
Source:

Works

Articles

References

External links
 
 

1874 births
1940 deaths
American pharmacologists
Burials at Forest Home Cemetery, Chicago
American hospital administrators
University of Michigan alumni
University of Illinois Chicago alumni